The Bhutan national basketball team represents Bhutan in international men's basketball and is controlled by the  Bhutan Basketball Federation.

In 2011, Bhutan's national basketball team played its first international match in the 26th FIBA Asia zone qualifying tournament in New Delhi. On the same year, it also joined the Sheik Kamal International basketball tournament, which was held in Bangladesh. The team was also named as the most disciplined team at the 2015 South Asian Basketball Association championship.

Coaches
 Kim Kiyong (2013-2015)
 Tenzin Jamtsho (2015-)

Competitions

FIBA Asia Cup

SABA Championship
2015 : 6th
2018 : 4th

South Asian Games
1995-2010 : Did Not Participate
2016 : 6th

References

External links
 Bhutan Basketball - Bhutan Olympic Committee
 Facebook presentation - Bhutan National Basketball Team
 Facebook presentation - Bhutan Basketball Federation

Men's national basketball teams
Basketball teams in Bhutan
Basketball